Beulah  is a small unincorporated community in Clayton County, Iowa, United States. A post office operated in Beulah from January 13, 1873, to October 31, 1905.

References

Unincorporated communities in Clayton County, Iowa
Unincorporated communities in Iowa
1873 establishments in Iowa
Populated places established in 1873